Kevin Rashard Garrett (born July 29, 1980) is a former American football player. Garrett attended Southern Methodist University and was drafted in the 2003 NFL Draft by the St. Louis Rams. He has previously played football with the St. Louis Rams, Houston Texans and the Carolina Panthers.

College career
He started 42 games at Southern Methodist and totaled 265 tackles, seven interceptions, 36 passes defensed, four forced fumbles and one fumble recovery in addition to blocking six kicks. In 2002 as a senior he made nine starts and registered 48 tackles, two interceptions, six passes defensed, one forced fumble, one fumble recovery and one blocked kick. The year before, in 2001,
he started all 11 games and was an honorable mention All-Western Athletic Conference selection. He Collected 62 tackles, three interceptions with one return for a touchdown, 14 passes defensed and one blocked kick. In 2000, he started all 12 game and ranked second on the Mustangs with 74 tackles, one interception, 12 passes defensed, two forced fumbles and two
blocked kicks. In 1999, he was named Western Athletic Conference Freshman of the Year by the
Fort Worth Star-Telegram. He made 10 starts and had a career-high 81 tackles, one interception, four passes defensed, one forced fumble and two blocked kicks. In 1998 Garrett redshirted as a true freshman.

Track and field
Garrett was also a track star at the Southern Methodist University, where he specialized in the 60 meters, 100 meters and 200 meters, but also participated in the 55 metres, posting a personal best of 6.41 seconds.

Garrett ran a 10.29 wind-aided in the 100 meters at Fresno, California.

Personal bests

Professional career

Pre-draft

St. Louis Rams
Garrett was selected in the fifth round (172nd overall) of the NFL Draft by the St. Louis Rams. He played in nine games, primarily on special teams, and was inactive for seven contests due to an injury suffered during the preseason. He posted eight special teams tackles. In 2004, he played in 14 games with one start, making 10 tackles, four passes defensed and 12 special teams stops. The next season, he went to training camp with St. Louis but was waived by the Rams in the final roster cutdown on September 3, 2005.

Houston Texans
Signed as a free agent by Kansas City (1/10/06) then waived by Kansas City (7/25/06) after which he was signed as a free agent by Houston (8/1/06) and then waived by Houston (9/3/06). Re-signed as a free agent by Houston (9/12/06) but waived by Houston eight days later after suffering a hamstring injury versus the Indianapolis Colts (9/20/06). He was signed as a free agent by Carolina (1/2/07).

Carolina Panthers
Garrett played the 2007 season with the Panthers.

References

External links
Just Sports Stats

Living people
1980 births
People from San Benito, Texas
American football cornerbacks
SMU Mustangs football players
Houston Texans players
Amsterdam Admirals players
St. Louis Rams players
Carolina Panthers players
Saskatchewan Roughriders players
American players of Canadian football